To Die in Jerusalem is a 2007 HBO documentary film about the effects of a March 29, 2002, Jerusalem suicide bombing on the families of the 17-year-old Israeli victim Rachel Levy and the 18-year-old Palestinian female suicide bomber, Ayat al-Akhras. Al-Akhras blew herself up at the entrance of Kiryat HaYovel's main supermarket, killing two people and injuring 28.

Awards
"To Die in Jerusalem" garnered HBO Documentary Films, in association with Priddy Brothers, a Peabody Award in 2007.

References

External links
 
 
 To Die in Jerusalem official website
 

2007 films
Israeli documentary films
Documentary films about the Israeli–Palestinian conflict